is a railway station on the Kagoshima Main Line, operated by JR Kyushu in Dazaifu, Fukuoka Prefecture, Japan.

Lines

Layout
The station consists of two opposed side platforms serving two tracks.

History
The station was opened by JR Kyushu on 11 March 1989 as an added station on the existing Kagoshima Main Line track.

See also 
List of railway stations in Japan

References

External links
Tofurōminami (JR Kyushu)

Railway stations in Fukuoka Prefecture
Buildings and structures in Dazaifu, Fukuoka
Railway stations in Japan opened in 1989